V4381 Sagittarii is a variable star in the constellation Sagittarius. A white supergiant of spectral type A2/A3Iab, it is an Alpha Cygni variable that varies between apparent photographic magnitudes 6.57 and 6.62. Its visual apparent magnitude is about 6.54.

V4381 Sagittarii is associated with a small reflection and emission nebula, although it is not actually seen within the nebulosity. The nebula is catalogued as GN 18.05.6. It was first listed as VdB 113 and described as possibly associated with a loose open cluster. That name has since been used for the cluster itself, which is much more distant than the distance of V4381 Sagittarii derived from its Hipparcos parallax. The whole cluster is less than a quarter of a degree across, with dozens of members from 8th magnitude downwards. V4381 Sagittarii is listed as a probable member, while the nearby bright stars HD 165516 and WR 111 are considered unlikely to be members.

Distance estimations
The distance to V4381 remains poorly determined as of 2021. The 2018 research based on radio interferometry has measured 2.2 milliarcseconds parallax, while Gaia Early Data Release 3, based on optical astrometry, have resulted in measured parallax 0.6273.

References

External links
 Image of VdB 113 V4381 Sgr is the upper of the two bright white stars.
 WEBDA page for vdBergh 113 V4381 Sgr is the brightest star
 Drawing of VdB 113 

Sagittarius (constellation)
Alpha Cygni variables
A-type supergiants
Sagittarii, V4381
165784
088876
BD-21 4866
J18083858-2126584
Sagittarii, 34